Lyneside railway station served the hamlet of West Linton, Cumbria, England, from 1861 to 1964 on the Waverley Line.

History 
The station opened sometime after 29 October 1861, when the line opened, but this date is not confirmed. The original name of the station was West Linton, but it was changed to Lineside on 10 October 1870 and finally changed to Lyneside in December 1871. The station was situated on the north side of an unnamed minor road. There was a single siding with a loop but there was no goods yard. The station closed to passengers on 1 November 1929 and closed completely on 5 October 1964.

References

External links 

Disused railway stations in Cumbria
Former Border Union Railway stations
Railway stations in Great Britain opened in 1861
Railway stations in Great Britain closed in 1929